Ernst Königsgarten (1880–1942), Austrian businessman and fencer
 Hugo Königsgarten (1904–1975), British-Austrian composer and author

 Königsgarten may also refer to Königsberg, former German city, now Kaliningrad